Soul Song is an album by saxophonist Archie Shepp recorded in 1982 for the Enja label.

Reception

Scott Yanow at AllMusic awarded the album 2 stars, stating: "This is one of Archie Shepp's more erratic sets ... due to this release's weak first half, it can be safely passed by".

Track listing
All compositions by Archie Shepp except where noted.
 "Mama Rose" – 15:17
 "Soul Song" – 4:00
 "Geechee" – 18:33
 "My Romance" (Richard Rodgers, Lorenz Hart) – 7:17 Bonus track on CD release

Personnel 
Archie Shepp – tenor saxophone, soprano saxophone, vocals
Kenny Werner – piano
Santi Debriano – bass  
Marvin Smith – drums

References 

1983 albums
Archie Shepp albums
Enja Records albums